Syntax Error is a 2003 short Australian comedy film directed by Andrew Lancaster.

Plot
Lauren (Sacha Horler) doesn't want to have a baby. She just wants to change the world into something different... the computer world. But to make changes, you sometimes have to break the code in order to make a computer that everyone can use.

Cast
 Sacha Horler as Lauren 
 Anthony Simcoe as Steve 
 Josh Quong Tart as Desmond
 Helmut Bakaitis as Doctor 
 Lucy McLure as Nurse #1
 Kim Cooper as Nurse #2

Reception
Syntax Error was among the Screen Music Awards 2004 nominees for "Best Music for a Short Film".

References

External links

2003 films
Australian comedy short films
2003 comedy films
2003 short films
2000s English-language films
2000s Australian films